Smudge was a British comic strip published in the comics magazine The Beano from April 19, 1980, until about 1999. He appeared regularly from 1980 to 1986, while continuing to make sporadic appearances into the 1990s, with his final appearance in the comics magazine coming in 1999. However, he was only seen twice after 1994. The series was drawn by John Geering.

Concept

Smudge was a little boy who described himself as "the scruffiest boy in town and proud of it", relishing any opportunity to get filthy. His main rival was the snooty Percival Primm. Other characters in the strip included Smudge's Mum and over the years he had two different pets firstly a mouse and an animal of a never revealed although bipedal species (this is something of a running joke in Smudge strips) completely covered in mud and called Spludge. 

There was also another character, a girl, of the same name in the 1940s Dandy. The two characters appeared alongside each other for comparison in the Side By Side 60 Years book.

References

Beano strips
1980 comics debuts
Comics characters introduced in 1984
1999 comics endings
Child characters in comics
Gag-a-day comics
British comics characters
Defunct British comics